Lobocla liliana, commonly known as the marbled flat, is a species of hesperiid butterfly which is found in the Indomalayan realm.

Range
The butterfly occurs in India, Myanmar, Thailand, Laos, north Vietnam and west China (Yunnan). In India, the butterfly ranges from the Himalayas, Sikkim and Assam eastwards to the Karen Hills in Myanmar.

Status
Common.

See also
Hesperiidae
List of butterflies of India (Hesperiidae)

Cited references

References

Print

Online

Hesperiidae
Butterflies of Asia
Butterflies of Indochina
Butterflies described in 1871
Taxa named by William Stephen Atkinson